The International Dance Organization (IDO) is an official, independent, politically neutral, non-profit, world dance and dance sport federation, registered in Slagelse, Denmark, for Performing Arts, Street Dance/Urban and Couple Dances.  Members of the IDO are national dance federations; only non-profit organizations can join. Some of the biggest IDO competitions, running for more than a week, are World Dance Olympiad in Moscow in Spring and the World Show Dance and Tap Championships in Riesa in November and the World Ballet, Modern & Contemporary Dance and Jazz Dance Championships in Poland and Slovenia in December.

History 
IDO was founded on September 18, 1981, by four countries: France, Gibraltar, Italy and Switzerland. The founder and first General Secretary was Moreno Polidori from Italy.

Leading the IDO:
 IDO General Secretary Moreno Polidori, Italy (1981 – 1998)
Since 1998 the IDO is headed by the IDO President:
 Nils Hakan Carlzon, Sweden (1998 – 2008)
 Bill Fowler, USA (2008 – 2011)
 Jörn Storbraten, Norway (2011 – 2014)
 Michael Wendt, Germany (2014 - 2017)
 Doug Howe, England (2018)
 Michael Wendt, Germany (2019 - 2020)
 Prof. Velibor Srdic (2020 - 2022 acting president) 
 Prof. Velibor Srdic (2022 - today)

Structure 
The IDO Executive Presidium (EPM) runs the daily business and consists of the President, the Senior Vice President and the Executive Secretary. The IDO Presidium consists of the EPM and 6 Vice Presidents with specific duties.

Nils Hakon Carlzon, Bill Fowler and Michael Wendt have been honoured as Honorary Lifetime Presidents.

The election of the Presidium takes place in a staggered system according to which the President, the Senior Vice President, the Executive Secretary/Treasurer and two (2) Vice Presidents (A, B) are elected in year 1, the 
four other Vice Presidents (C, D, E, F) are elected in year 3, each for a term of four (4) years. The three Department Directors, Performing Arts, Street Dance and Couple Dance, are elected every three years at their Annual Department Meeting (ADM) and also serve on the Presidium. Same for the elected chairpersons of the Continental Conferences.

The AGA is also responsible for all changes in the statutes and by-laws. The ADMs are responsible for the Dance Sport rules, which are ratified by the AGA. To enable the experts in each specific field to discuss their department matters at the level where the dancers are, IDO has installed the following committees and departments:
 Adjudication committee
 Disciplinary committee
 Education committee
 Couple Dance department
 Performing Arts department
 Street Dance department

Worldwide memberships and structure

IDO has more than 90 member nations and contacts on all six continents, representing more than 250,000 dancers worldwide.
To ensure growth and focus on existing intercontinental and new countries worldwide, the IDO has installed ambassadors to develop the IDO idea and structure. For example in

 Asia / Asia-Pacific - Michael Wendt, Germany,
 The Americas - Bonnie Dyer, Canada.
 Iberian peninsula - Seamus Byrne, Gibraltar

Besides running competitions and festivals, IDO established its Hall of Fame to honour dance celebrities, dancers and dance enthusiasts who have made significant contributions to IDO’s Dance World.

IDO also follows the anti-doping requirements requested.

IDO is affiliated to TAFISA and EUSA.

Dance disciplines and competitions 
Each year the IDO organizes World, Continental and Regional championships and cups in the IDO dance disciplines.

Age divisions
 Mini Kids
 Children
 Junior I
 Junior II
 Adults
 Adult 2
 Seniors

Categories
 Solo female
 Solo male
 Duo
 Couples
 Trio (Tap Dance only)
 Group/Team (3-7 dancers)
 Formation (8-24 dancers)

Dance styles

PERFORMING ARTS DISCIPLINES
 Acrobatic Dance
 Ballet/Pointe
 Belly Dance/Oriental
 Bollywood
 Flamenco
 Folklore Dance
 Jazz Dance/Lyrical
 Modern Dance and Contemporary Dance
 Performing Arts Improvisation
 Show Dance
 Tap Dance
 Productions

STREET DANCE DISCIPLINES
 B-boying|Break Dance
 Electric Boogie/Popping
 Hip Hop
 Hip Hop Battles
 Disco Dance
 Disco Dance Freestyle
 Disco Dance Show
 Street Dance Show
 Productions

COUPLE DANCE DISCIPLINES
 Argentine Tango (Tango, Milonga, Tango Vals and Tango Fantasia)
 Bachata
 Caribbean Dances (Salsa, Merengue, Bachata)
 Caribbean Show
 Couple Dance Formations
 Hustle/Disco-Swing/Disco-Fox
 Jitterbug
 Latin Show
 Latin Style
 Merengue
 Salsa 
 Salsa Rueda de Casino
 Synchro Dance
 West Coast Swing
 Productions

References

External links 
Official IDO website

World Dance Olympiad
World Showdance Championships
Dance Week Riesa
IDO Competitions in Youtube

Dancesport
Dancesport competitions
Dancesport organizations
International organizations based in Denmark
Organizations established in 1981